Pietro Francesco Prina (active 18th century) was born in Novara and was an Italian engraver, active in Milan. He trained with Marc Antonio Franceschini in Bologna. He engraved history scenes and capricci.

References

Year of birth unknown
Year of death unknown
Italian engravers
People from Novara